Targen's Tome: A Master's Guide to Magic is a book about Magic: The Gathering published by Chessex.

Contents
Targen's Tome: A Master's Guide to Magic is a guide for players of Magic: The Gathering, and includes information on deck design, outlining the nine basic types of deck, along with the key cards used to build them.

Reception
Chris Lloyd reviewed Targen's Tome: A Master's Guide to Magic for Arcane magazine, rating it a 5 out of 10 overall. Lloyd comments that "Targen's Tome is an interesting and informative read for new Magic players, but the rest of us will be looking for more hard and fast advice on effective decks and card combinations than is offered here."

Reviews
Dragon #227

References

Books about collectible card games
Magic: The Gathering publications